The use of exponential generating functions (EGFs) to study the properties of Stirling numbers is a classical exercise in combinatorial mathematics and possibly the canonical example of how symbolic combinatorics is used. It also illustrates the parallels in the construction of these two types of numbers, lending support to the binomial-style notation that is used for them.

Given a combinatorial class, the cycle operator creates the class obtained by placing objects from the source class along a cycle of some length, where cyclical symmetries are taken into account, and the set operator creates the class obtained by placing objects from the source class in a set (symmetries from the symmetric group, i.e. an "unstructured bag".) The two combinatorial classes (shown without additional markers) are
 permutations (for unsigned Stirling numbers of the first kind):

and
 set partitions into non-empty subsets (for Stirling numbers of the second kind):

 
where  is the singleton class.

Warning: The notation used here for the Stirling numbers is not that of the Wikipedia articles on Stirling numbers; square brackets denote the signed Stirling numbers here.

Stirling numbers of the first kind

The unsigned Stirling numbers of the first kind count the number of permutations of [n] with k cycles. A permutation is a set of cycles, and hence the set  of permutations is given by

where the singleton  marks cycles. This decomposition is examined in some detail on the page on the statistics of random permutations.

Translating to generating functions we obtain the mixed generating function of the unsigned Stirling numbers of the first kind:

Now the signed Stirling numbers of the first kind are obtained from the unsigned ones through the relation

Hence the generating function  of these numbers is

A variety of identities may be derived by manipulating this generating function:

In particular, the order of summation may be exchanged, and derivatives taken, and then z or u may be fixed.

Finite sums
A simple sum is

This formula holds because the exponential generating function of the sum is

Infinite sums
Some infinite sums include

where  (the singularity nearest to 

This relation holds because

Stirling numbers of the second kind

These numbers count the number of partitions of [n] into k nonempty subsets. First consider the total number of partitions, i.e. Bn where

i.e. the Bell numbers. The Flajolet–Sedgewick fundamental theorem applies (labelled case).
The set  of partitions into non-empty subsets is given by ("set of non-empty sets of singletons")

This decomposition is entirely analogous to the construction of the set  of permutations from cycles, which is given by

and yields the Stirling numbers of the first kind. Hence the name "Stirling numbers of the second kind."

The decomposition is equivalent to the EGF

Differentiate to obtain

which implies that

by convolution of exponential generating functions and because differentiating an EGF drops the first coefficient and shifts Bn+1 to z n/n!.

The EGF of the Stirling numbers of the second kind is obtained by marking every subset that goes into the partition with the term , giving

Translating to generating functions, we obtain

This EGF yields the formula for the Stirling numbers of the second kind:

or

which simplifies to

References 
 Ronald Graham, Donald Knuth, Oren Patashnik (1989): Concrete Mathematics, Addison–Wesley, 
 D. S. Mitrinovic, Sur une classe de nombre relies aux nombres de Stirling, C. R. Acad. Sci. Paris 252 (1961), 2354–2356.
 A. C. R. Belton, The monotone Poisson process, in: Quantum Probability (M. Bozejko, W. Mlotkowski and J. Wysoczanski, eds.), Banach Center Publications 73, Polish Academy of Sciences, Warsaw, 2006
 Milton Abramowitz and Irene A. Stegun, Handbook of Mathematical Functions with Formulas, Graphs, and Mathematical Tables, USGPO, 1964, Washington DC, 

Enumerative combinatorics